Sowell is a surname.  It may refer to:  

 Anthony Sowell (1959–2021), American serial killer
 Arnie Sowell (born 1935), American middle distance runner
 Bobby Sowell (born 1947), American musician
 Dawn Sowell (born 1966), American sprinter
 Jerald Sowell (born 1974), American football player
 Mike Sowell, American sports historian and professor of journalism
 Shaunna Sowell, American engineer
 Thomas Sowell (born 1930), American economist, political commentator, and author

See also
 Sewell